Bowie is a Scottish and Irish surname. The name can be derived from the Gaelic nickname buidhe, meaning "yellow", "fair-haired". The surname can also be an Anglicised form of the Irish surname Ó Buadhaigh; this surname means "descendant of Buadhach" and is also rendered as Bogue and Boyce. The personal name Buadhach means "victorious". The surname Bowie is rendered in Scottish Gaelic as Buidheach (masculine) and Bhuidheach (feminine), as well as Mac'IlleBhuidhe (masculine) and Nic'IlleBhuidhe (feminine).  Early instances of the surname in Scotland, recorded in 1481, are: Boye, Bowy, and Boee.

A family of the surname, the Bowie family, was one of the colonial families of Maryland with John Bowie Sr. being the first Bowie in the colony.

People with the surname 
 Alistair Bowie (born 1951), Scottish footballer
 Andrew Bowie (disambiguation), list of people with the name
Angie Bowie (born 1949), American, former wife of David Bowie
Angus M. Bowie (born 1949), British classicist
Anthony Bowie (born 1963), American basketball player
 Arturo Valenzuela Bowie (Arturo Valenzuela, born 1944), Chilean-American academic
Ash Bowie (born 1968), American musician
 Beth Mburu-Bowie (born 1987), English musician
Christopher Bowie (born 1966), Canadian swimmer
David Bowie (1947–2016), musician, artist, and actor
 Don Bowie (climber) (born 1969), Canadian professional climber
 Don Bowie (footballer) (born 1940), Scottish footballer
 Eric A. Bowie (born 1936), Canadian judge
Fiona Bowie (born before 1990), Canadian artist
 George Washington Bowie (18271901), American who served in the Union army during the Civil War
 Gordon W. Bowie (before 19852012), American trombonist, composer and conductor
 Henry Pike Bowie (18481921), American lawyer, artist, author, Japanologist and diplomat
Jac Bowie (born 1979), Australian burlesque producer
James Bowie (17961836), 19th-century Texan revolutionary
James Bowie (botanist) (17891869), English botanist
James Bowie (footballer) (18881972), Scottish footballer
 Jamie Bowie (born 1989), British track and field athlete
Jerome Bowie (d. 1597), Scottish master of the royal wine cellar
 Jim Bowie (baseball) (born 1965), Major League Baseball player
 Jimmy Bowie (19242000), Scottish footballer
Joanne W. Bowie (active 19892004), American politician from North Carolina
 John Bowie (disambiguation), multiple people
Joseph Bowie (born 1953), American bandleader, trombonist, and founder of the jazz fusion band Defunkt
Larry Bowie (guard) (19392012), American Football guard
Larry Bowie (running back) (born 1973), American Football running back
 Les Bowie (191379), Canadian-born special effects artist who worked mainly in Britain
Lester Bowie (194199), American jazz musician
Malcolm Bowie (19432007), British academic
Micah Bowie (born 1974), American baseball player
 Michael Bowie (born 1991), American Football player
 Nate Bowie (born 1986), professional basketball player
Norman E. Bowie (born 1942), American academic
Oden Bowie (182694), American politician from Maryland 
Reginald Bowie (1854–1926), American politician and businessman
Rezin Bowie (17931841), American inventor and designer of the Bowie knife, politician in Louisiana
Richard Bowie (180781), American politician from Maryland 
Robert Bowie (17501818), American politician from Maryland 
Robert R. Bowie (19092013), American diplomat
Russell Bowie (18801959), Canadian ice hockey player
Sam Bowie (born 1961), American basketball player
 Sam Bowie (rugby league) (born 1989), Australian rugby league player
 Stanley Bowie (19172008), Scottish geologist
Sydney J. Bowie (18651928), U.S. Representative from Alabama
Thomas Fielder Bowie (180869), American politician from Maryland
Todd Bowie (born 1965), American guitarist and technician
Tori Bowie (born 1990), American long jumper
Walter Bowie (17481810), American politician, delegate to the Annapolis Convention (1774–1776) 
Walter Russell Bowie (18821969), American theologian
Captain William Bowie (1721after 1776), American politician, delegate to the Annapolis Convention (1774–1776) 
William Bowie (agrarian) (17761826), American agrarian and delegate to the Maryland state convention to charter the Chesapeake & Ohio Canal 
William Bowie (footballer) (18691934), Scottish footballer
William Bowie (engineer) (18721940), American geodetic engineer 
William Duckett Bowie (180373) American politician from Maryland

See also
Dowie
Cowie (surname)

References

Anglicised Irish-language surnames
English-language surnames
Scottish surnames
Scottish Gaelic-language surnames